BVN (Het beste van NPO,  "The best of NPO"), is a Dutch free-to-air television channel providing Dutch public-service television to viewers around the world.

It is a service of the public broadcasting company of the Netherlands, Nederlandse Publieke Omroep (NPO).

BVN has grown to become a major international channel with worldwide coverage.

History
The channel started in 1996 as Zomer-TV (Summer-TV), an operation aimed at making Dutch-language programming available to Dutch and Flemish holidaymakers abroad.

All of its programming originally came from the Netherlands (the abbreviation BVN at first standing for het Beste Van Nederland, "the best of the Netherlands") but this was later adapted, once the Flemish Region of Belgium began contributing both financially and with output from the schedules of its public broadcaster, Vlaamse Radio- en Televisieomroep (VRT), to het Beste van Vlaanderen en Nederland: "the best of Flanders and the Netherlands".

Radio Nederland Wereldomroep (RNW) was involved as a founding partner, but left in 2012.

In March 2007 BVN changed its scheduling from three 8-hour programming blocks to two 12-hour blocks: this provided more room for the inclusion in the schedules of such popular shows as De Wereld Draait Door (BNNVARA).

The Flemish Region announced in April 2021 that it would end funding for BVN programming after June of that year; with VRT's foreign offerings transitioning to digital platforms afterwards. Accordingly, BVN became an exclusively Dutch-funded service on 1 July 2021; satellite distribution to Sub-Saharan Africa via SES-1 ceased on 1 May, with distribution to Asia on AsiaSat 5, Oceania on Optus D2, and North America on Galaxy 19 ending on 1 July, and on MultiChoice's DStv platform in South Africa on 1 November. BVN would later announce that coverage in Sub-Saharan Africa would be restored via the Astra 4A satellite from 25 October.

Access
There are three main access methods: 
 Satellite - A range of satellites carry BVN, often as a free-to-air channel. User need to be within the "footprint" of a satellite that carries the channel, and have a suitable dish and receiver.
 Cable - Cable television providers in many places have BVN as one of the available channels
 Internet - The BVN service is now also available worldwide as a streaming service "BVNLIVE" over the Internet (except from IP addresses in the Netherlands)

Programming
All programmes are replayed during the second 12-hour block, running from 0100 to 1300 CET daily.

News and current affairs
BVN broadcasts daily news bulletins from NOS. The main 2000 bulletin from NOS Journaal is broadcast at 2030 CET and features a specially produced international weather forecast (BVN-Weer). A short bulletin is also carried at 1600 CET on weekdays and at 1605 on weekends.

Current affairs output on weekdays consists of the magazine programme EénVandaag (One Today) at 1830 CET, Nieuwsuur (Newshour, which incorporates an NOS Journaal bulletin). EénVandaag is produced by independent pillar broadcasters (AVROTROS) while Nieuwsuur is co-produced by NOS and the NTR.

On Sundays, BVN carries the political talk show Buitenhof at 1530.

Topical debate and entertainment programmes also feature in the schedule including De wereld draait door (The World Keeps Turning) at 1940 CET and Pauw or Jinek at around 2350 CET. Both programmes are off-air during the Summer and are produced by BNN-VARA subsidiary VARA.

Sport
NOS produces 15 minutes sports news bulletins called Sportjournaal on weekdays along with Studio Sport, a longer sports news and highlights programme on Saturday nights. The sports magazine show Holland Sport is broadcast periodically on Saturday afternoons. During the football season, Eredivisie highlights are broadcast in NOS's Studio Sport on Saturday nights & Sunday evenings.

Children
BVN features a daily block of children's programming, consisting of new and archived programming from various pillar broadcasters in the Netherlands, NTR, the NPO children's television stations NPO Z@pp as well NPO Z@ppelin.

Dedicated news and current affairs output for children is also broadcast at weekends, including a weekly current affairs programme Schooltv-weekjournaal, on Saturdays and a news review, NOS Jeugdjournaal Overzicht (NOS Youth Journal Overview), on Sundays.

Features and entertainment
BVN's daily schedule features entertainment, documentaries and features output.

Programming includes documentary series Spoorloos (Without a Trace) as well as various music specials.

Drama
BVN broadcasts a number of popular drama series and serials including Klem (Stuck) and Flikken Rotterdam (Rotterdam Cops).

During the summer, BVN transmits movies from the Netherlands on Saturday nights.

Former Flemish programs 
Until VRT left the BVN joint venture in 2021, the channel also presented various Flemish programmes.

The 1pm and 7pm editions of VRT's Het Journaal were transmitted on a short time delay at 1300 and 1905 CET from Sunday to Friday. The 1900 bulletin was broadcast from 1915 on Saturdays. VRT public affairs programs Terzake (To The Point) aired at around midnight CET each evening, and a delayed broadcast of VRT's current affairs magazine De Zevende Dag (The Seventh Day) aired at 1330 CET on Sundays. VRT's sports coverage was featured daily within short sports bulletins on Het Journaal at 1300 and 1900. On Sundays throughout the year, the 1910 Het Journaal bulletin was shortened to 20 minutes to allow for a half-hour round-up entitled Sportweekend to follow at 1930. During the football season, the 1300 bulletin on Sunday featured an extended goals round-up from the Jupiler League (Belgian First Division).

VRT entertainment programmes that aired on BVN included the quiz show Blokken (Blocks) and the long running sitcom Thuis (Home), Flemish movies on Saturday nights, and programmes from the VRT children's television station, Ketnet.

References

External links
Official website
BVN at LyngSat Address
BVN reception

Television channels in the Netherlands
Television channels in Flanders
Defunct television channels in Belgium
Netherlands Public Broadcasting
International broadcasters
Television channels and stations established in 1996
1996 establishments in the Netherlands
1996 establishments in Belgium
2021 disestablishments in Belgium